Christopher McLean Skinner  (born June 4, 1972) is an American mathematician working in number theory and arithmetic aspects of the Langlands program.  He specialises in algebraic number theory.

Skinner was a Packard Foundation Fellow from 2001 to 2006, and was named an inaugural fellow of the American Mathematical Society in 2013. In 2015, he was named a Simons Investigator in Mathematics. He was an invited speaker at the International Congress of Mathematicians in Madrid in 2006.

Career 

Skinner graduated from the University of Michigan in 1993. After completing his PhD with Andrew Wiles in 1997, he moved to the University of Michigan as an assistant professor. Since 2006, he has been a Professor of Mathematics at the Princeton University. In joint work with Andrew Wiles, Skinner proved modularity results for residually reducible Galois representations. Together with Eric Urban, he proved many cases of Iwasawa–Greenberg main conjectures for a large class of modular forms. As a consequence, for a modular elliptic curve over the rational numbers, they prove that the vanishing of the Hasse–Weil L-function L(E, s) of E at s = 1 implies that the p-adic Selmer group of E is infinite. Combined with theorems of Gross–Zagier and Kolyvagin, this gave a conditional proof (on the Tate–Shafarevich conjecture) of the conjecture that E has infinitely many rational points if and only if L(E, 1) =  0, a (weak) form of the Birch–Swinnerton-Dyer conjecture. These results were used (in joint work with Manjul Bhargava and Wei Zhang) to prove that a positive proportion of elliptic curves satisfy the Birch–Swinnerton-Dyer conjecture.

References 

Fellows of the American Mathematical Society
21st-century American mathematicians
Princeton University alumni
Living people
1972 births
University of Michigan alumni